Houston Hurricanes may refer to:
Houston Hurricane, (1978–1980), a North American Soccer League team
Houston Hurricanes, (1996–2000), aUSL First Division team
Houston Hurricanes FC, (2012–present), a National Premier Soccer League team
 Houston Hurricanes (cricket), a team in the USA's Minor League Cricket

See also
:Category:Houston hurricanes, hurricanes that passed over Houston, Texas